The Colombia women's national tennis team represents Colombia in Fed Cup tennis competition and are governed by the Federación Colombiana de Tenis.  They currently compete in the Americas Zone of Group I.

Current team (2017)
 Mariana Duque Mariño 
 María Fernanda Herazo
 Emiliana Arango
 María Camila Osorio Serrano

History
Colombia competed in its first Fed Cup in 1972.  Their best result was reaching the World Group in 1994 and 2003.

See also
Fed Cup
Colombia Davis Cup team

References

External links

Billie Jean King Cup teams
Fed Cup
Fed Cup